Eleri Mills (born 1955) is a Welsh painter.

Life
Mills was born in Llangadfan in Powys, and gained a B.A. in Art and Design from Manchester Polytechnic. She was elected to the Royal Cambrian Academy in 2000 and in 2012 was an artist-in-residence at Columbia University in New York.

References

External links
 

1955 births
Living people
20th-century Welsh painters
21st-century Welsh painters
20th-century Welsh women artists
21st-century Welsh women artists
Alumni of Manchester Metropolitan University
Welsh women painters